Želimir is a masculine given name. People bearing the name include:

 Želimir Altarac Čičak (1947–2021), Bosnian rock promoter
 Želimir Bebek (born 1945), Bosnian singer
 Želimir Cerović (1948–2019), Montenegrin basketball executive and basketball player
 Želimir Obradović (born 1960), Serbian professional basketball head coach
 Želimir Puljić (born 1947), Croatian archbishop
 Želimir Stinčić (born 1950), Croatian footballer
 Želimir Terkeš (born 1981), Bosnian-Herzegovinian football striker
 Želimir Vidović (1953–1992), Bosnian footballer
 Želimir Vuković (born 1983), Serbian alpine skier
 Želimir Žilnik (born 1942), Serbian film director

See also 

 Željko

Bosnian masculine given names
Croatian masculine given names
Serbian masculine given names